Fuat Sirmen (21 November 1899 – 17 May 1981) was a Turkish politician.

Early life
He was born in Constantinople in 1899. He graduated from the law school in 1924 and two years later he was sent to Rome for further studies by the Ministry of Justice. After his doctorate studies in the Law school of Rome University in 1930, he returned to Turkey and served in the Ministry of Justice.

Political career
In 1935 he began his political career in the Republican People's Party (CHP). He was elected  MP from Erzurum Province and later Rize Province. Between 9 March 1943 and 7 August 1946 he served as the Minister of Economy in the 14th government of Turkey. (Second Şükrü Saraçoğlu government)  Between 10 June 1948 and 22 May 1950 he served as the Minister of Justice in the 17th and 18th government of Turkey (Second Hasan Saka and Şemsettin Günaltay governments). In 1950 elections he lost his seat and began serving as an attorney.

In 1961 he was elected as an MP from Rize Province. On 1 November the same year he was elected as the Speaker of the Turkish parliament (Lower House). He continued until 22 October 1965. In 1965 elections in which his party was defeated he was elected as MP from İstanbul Province. But his position as the parliament speaker ended. He also finished his political life in 1969.

Death
He died of cancer in 1981 in İstanbul. He was laid to rest in Zincirlikuyu Cemetery.

References

1899 births
1981 deaths
Darülfünun alumni
Istanbul University Faculty of Law alumni
Politicians from Istanbul
Republican People's Party (Turkey) politicians
Speakers of the Parliament of Turkey
Members of the 14th government of Turkey
Members of the 17th government of Turkey
Members of the 18th government of Turkey